Gebre Birkay (born 1926) is an Ethiopian long-distance runner. He competed in the marathon at the 1956 Summer Olympics.

References

External links

1926 births
Possibly living people
Athletes (track and field) at the 1956 Summer Olympics
Ethiopian male long-distance runners
Ethiopian male marathon runners
Olympic athletes of Ethiopia
Place of birth missing (living people)